Telkom Foundation was formerly known as Telkom Education Foundation (YPT) and Sandhykara Putra Telkom Foundation (YSPT). YPT has been providing service for 24 years while YSPT has also providing service for 34 years before both foundations merged in 2014. Now, under the name Telkom Foundation, the foundation has evolved into one of the best foundations in Indonesia, in providing education services.

Introducing the One Pipe Education System (OPES) for primary & secondary level of educations, Telkom Foundation currently manages 44 schools. The schools manages certain levels of schools, including Kindergarten, Elementary, Junior, Senior high, and Vocational School. Telkom Fondation also manages four higher education Institutions, Telkom University, Telkom College of Telematics Technology (ST4), Sandhy Putra Tourism Academy Bandung & Telkom Academy Jakarta. Moreover, Telkom Foundation also manages Telkom Professional Development Center (Telkom PDC), a training center dedicated in developing Indonesian Human Resource Competences.

Realizing the great size of financial power requires in developing education quality, in lines with attempt to complying World Class University level in 2017, Telkom Foundation has established several alternative funding sources; as up until now, Telkom Foundation developed four holding companies, which consist of PT. Edu Jasa Utama (PT. Mega Utama Rekanindo, PT. Mitra Karya Soludindo Utama, PT. Trengginas Jaya), PT. Jaringan Solusi Utama (PT. Sandhy Putra Makmur), PT Citra Sukapura Megah, and PT. Edu Medika Komunika ( PT. Radio Lintas Kontinental, PT. Radio Karang Tumaritis, PT. Tuvendo Jaya Utama, PT. Mekka, PT. Publika Edu Media), as well as Telkom Professional Certification Center, and Bandung Techno Park.

In 2017, Telkom Foundation Projecting its business units to achieve targeted revenue of 4 trillion IDR to support 80% operational cost of Telkom Foundation as it has committed to provide affordable qualified education for everyone.

History

YPT

YSPT

Telkom Foundation

References

Education in Indonesia
Foundations based in Indonesia